Atticus (died 5 November 425) was the archbishop of Constantinople, succeeding Arsacius of Tarsus in March 406. He had been an opponent of John Chrysostom and helped Arsacius of Tarsus depose him, but later became a supporter of him after his death. He rebuilt the small church that was located on the site of the later Hagia Sophia, and was an opponent of the Pelagians, which helped increase his popularity among the citizens of Constantinople.

Biography
Born at Sebaste in Armenia, he early embraced a monastic life, and received his education from some Macedonian monks near that place. Removing to Constantinople, he adopted the orthodox faith, was ordained presbyter, and soon became known as a rising man. He proved himself one of Chrysostom's most bitter adversaries. If not, as Palladius of Galatia asserts, the architect of the whole cabal, he certainly took a very leading part in carrying it into execution. The organization of the Synod of the Oak owed much to his practical skill. The expulsion of Chrysostom took place 10 June 404. His successor, the aged Arsacius, died 5 November 405. Four months of intrigue ended in the selection of Atticus.

Vigorous measures were at once adopted by Atticus in conjunction with the other members of the triumvirate to which the Eastern church had been subjected, Theophilus of Alexandria, and Porphyry of Antioch, to crush the adherents of Chrysostom. An imperial rescript was obtained imposing the severest penalties on all who dared to reject the communion of the patriarchs. A large number of the bishops of the East persevered in the refusal, and suffered a cruel persecution; while even the inferior clergy and laity were compelled to keep themselves in concealment or to fly the country. The small minority of Eastern bishops who for peace's sake deserted Chrysostom's cause were made to feel the guilt of having once supported it, being compelled to leave their sees and take other dioceses in the inhospitable regions of Thrace, where they might be more under Atticus's eye and hand.

Unity seemed hardly nearer when the death of Chrysostom (14 September 407) removed the original ground of the schism. A large proportion of the Christian population of Constantinople still refused communion with the usurper, and continued to hold their religious assemblies, more numerously attended than the churches, in the open air in the suburbs of the city, until Chrysostom's name took its place on the registers and in the public prayers of the church of Constantinople.

Atticus's endeavours were vigorously directed to the maintenance and enlargement of the authority of the see of Constantinople. He obtained a rescript from emperor Theodosius II subjecting to it the whole of Illyria and the "Provincia Orientalis." This gave great offence to Pope Boniface I and the emperor Honorius, and the decree was never put into execution. Another rescript declaring his right to decide on and approve of the election of all the bishops of the province was more effectual. Silvanus was named by him bishop of Philippopolis, and afterwards removed to Alexandria Troas. Atticus asserted his right to ordain in Bithynia, and put it in practice at Nicaea in 425.

Teachings
Atticus displayed great vigour in combating and repressing heresy. He wrote to the bishops of Pamphylia and to Amphilochius of Iconium, calling on them to drive out the Messalians (Phot. c. 52). The zeal and energy he displayed against the Pelagians are highly commended by Pope Celestine I, who goes so far as to style him "a true successor of St. Chrysostom".; Theod. Ep. cxlv.). His writings were quoted as those of an orthodox teacher by the councils of Ephesus and Chalcedon.

Atticus was more an actor than a writer; and of what he did publish little remains. A treatise On Virginity, combating by anticipation the errors of Nestorius, addressed to emperor Theodosius I's daughters Pulcheria and her sisters, is mentioned by Marcellinus.

Socrates Scholasticus, who is a partial witness, attributes to him a sweet and winning disposition which caused him to be regarded with much affection. Those who thought with him found in him a warm friend and supporter. Towards his theological adversaries he at first showed great severity, and after they submitted, changed his behaviour and won them by gentleness.

Veneration
He is highly regarded for his charity and piety and is venerated as a Saint in the Eastern Orthodox Church, which observes his feast on 8 January.

References

Attribution
 cites:
Labbe, Conc. iii. 353, 361, 365, 518, 1073, iv. 831;
Niceph. xiii. 30, xiv. 23, 27;
Palladius of Galatia. Dial. c. xx;
Phot. c. 52; cf. S. Prosper. p. 549;
S. Leo. Ep. cvi.;
Socr. H. E. vii. 25, 28, 36, 37, 41;
Soz. viii. 27;
Theod. Ep. cv.

Further reading
Gross, Ernie. This Day in Religion. New York:Neal-Schuman Publishers. 

Year of birth missing
420s deaths
5th-century Archbishops of Constantinople
Byzantine saints of the Eastern Orthodox Church
5th-century Christian saints
Byzantine people of Armenian descent
People from Sivas